Tevin Homer (born March 13, 1995) is an American football defensive back for the Bay Area Panthers of the Indoor Football League (IFL).

College career 
Homer played college football at Florida Atlantic. Homer only played in 11 games for the Owls, recording only 3 tackles and being used primarily on special teams.

Professional career

Washington Redskins 
Homer signed with the Washington Redskins after going undrafted in the 2017 NFL Draft. He was signed after a tryout. Homer was released before the start of the regular season.

Winnipeg Blue Bombers 
Homer signed with the Winnipeg Blue Bombers of the Canadian Football League in February 2018.

Albany Empire 
Homer joined the Albany Empire of the Arena Football League following a tryout camp in Orlando, Florida.

Jersey Flight 
Homer signed with the Jersey Flight of the National Arena League on February 18, 2021.

Northern Arizona Wranglers 
On April 3, 2022, Homer signed with the Northern Arizona Wranglers of the Indoor Football League (IFL). On December 7, 2022, Homer was released by the Wranglers.

Bay Area Panthers 
On December 12, 2022, Homer signed with the Bay Area Panthers of the Indoor Football League (IFL).

References 

Living people
1995 births
Florida Atlantic Owls football players
Washington Redskins players
Winnipeg Blue Bombers players
Albany Empire (AFL) players